State Route 149 (SR 149) is a  state highway that connects the south suburbs of Mountain Brook and Homewood with the Southside of downtown Birmingham, in the central part of the U.S. state of Alabama. It is in the shape of the letter C. Before the completion of Interstate 65 (I-65), SR 149 was the truck route of U.S. Route 31 (US 31) and US 280.

Route description
The southern terminus of SR 149 is at a folded diamond-type interchange with US 280 (internally designated as SR 38) just southwest of Mountain Brook. Although signed as a north–south highway, it initially travels to the southwest along Shades Creek Parkway. The highway passes Colonial Brookwood Village, one of the larger shopping malls in the Birmingham metro area and then enters Homewood, whereupon Shades Creek Parkway intersects US 31 (Montgomery Parkway; internally designated as SR 3) at a cloverleaf interchange and the name of the road changes to Lakeshore Drive. Along Lakeshore Drive, SR 149 passes the campus of Samford University.

At the intersection of Lakeshore Drive and Green Springs Highway, SR 149 turns to the north-northwest and is routed along Green Springs Highway, continuing in Homewood until the route crosses the crest of Red Mountain, where the route enters the city limits of Birmingham. SR 149 closely parallels I-65 for approximately  until it approaches the campus of the University of Alabama at Birmingham (UAB). Here the state route has an interchange with I-65, although there are no trailblazers on I-65 indicating that the two routes junction. Near this interchange, the name of Green Springs Highway changes to University Boulevard and northbound SR 149 curves to the northeast.

After the interchange with I-65, SR 149 passes through the heart of the UAB campus.

SR 149 also provides direct access to several Birmingham-area hospitals, including UAB Hospital and Children's of Alabama. East of the UAB campus and the hospitals, SR 149 continues approximately  until it reaches its northern terminus at a folded-diamond interchange with US 31/US 280 (Elton B. Stephens Expressway). There are no signs on US 31 south/US 280 east to alert motorists that they are meeting SR 149; however, recently installed signs on US 31 north/US 280 west inform motorists of the interchange with the highway.

Major intersections

See also

References

149
Transportation in Jefferson County, Alabama
149
U.S. Route 31